James Reid (born December 15, 1990) is a Canadian former professional ice hockey goaltender. He last played for the Evansville IceMen of the ECHL.

Career 
After a junior career with the Spokane Chiefs in the Western Hockey League, he is the Spokane Chiefs all-time leader in regular season wins with 85, Reid was signed to a contract to make his professional debut with the Lake Erie Monsters of the American Hockey League (AHL) in the 2011–12 season. He also played part of the season on loan with the Allen Americans of the Central Hockey League (CHL) and Alaska Aces of the ECHL.

Career statistics

Awards and honors

References

External links

1990 births
Living people
Alaska Aces (ECHL) players
Allen Americans players
Evansville IceMen players
Lake Erie Monsters players
Orlando Solar Bears (ECHL) players
Spokane Chiefs players
Ice hockey people from Calgary
Canadian ice hockey goaltenders